The Esparbès de Lussan family is an ancient noble house from Armagnac in France. Its name is mentioned in a number of 12th, 13th, and 14th century charters. One of its most notable members is Louise d'Esparbès de Lussan, mistress to the future Charles X of France.

History of Aquitaine
French noble families